Hand signaling, also known as arb or arbing (short for arbitrage), is a system of hand signals used on financial trading floors to communicate buy and sell information in an open outcry trading environment. The system is used at financial exchanges such as the Chicago Mercantile Exchange (CME) and the American Stock Exchange (AMEX). The AMEX is the only U.S. stock market to permit the transmission of buy and sell orders through hand signals.

Traders usually flash the signals quickly across a room to make a sale or a purchase. Signals that occur with palms facing out and hands away from the body are an indication the gesturer wishes to sell. When traders face their palms in and hold their hands up, they are gesturing to buy.

Numbers one through five are gestured on one hand with the fingers pointing directly upwards. To indicate six through ten, the hand is held sideways, parallel to the ground. Counting starts from six when the hand is held in this way. Numbers gestured from the forehead are blocks of ten; blocks of hundreds and thousands can be indicated by repeatedly touching the forehead with a closed fist. The signals can otherwise be used to indicate months, specific trade option combinations or additional market information.

Rules vary significantly among exchanges; however, the purpose of the gestures remains the same.

See also 
 Chinese number gestures
 Finger binary
 Nonverbal communication
 Sign language

References

External links
 Trading Pit History

Sign systems